Argyrotaenia nigrorbis is a species of moth of the family Tortricidae. It is found in Peru.

The wingspan is about 23 mm. The ground colour of the forewings is glossy white, with blackish grey strigulae (fine streaks). The dorsal part of the median fascia is grey marked with rust and there are black-grey markings with black parts. The hindwings are whitish, but brownish in the distal third.

Etymology
The species name refers to the forewing colouration and is derived from Latin niger (meaning black) and orbis (meaning circle).

References

Moths described in 2010
nigrorbis
Moths of South America